Best of Lari White is the first compilation album by the American country music artist of the same name, released on January 28, 1997. It is composed mainly of tracks from her first three albums for RCA: Lead Me Not (1993), Wishes (1994), and Don't Fence Me In (1996). The tracks "Amazing Grace" and "Helping Me Get over You" (a duet with Travis Tritt) were previously unreleased on any of White's albums, although "Helping Me Get Over You" was included on Tritt's 1996 album The Restless Kind.

Track listing

References
[ Best of Lari White] at Allmusic

1997 compilation albums
Lari White albums
RCA Records compilation albums